Gardneria multiflora is a species of flowering plant belonging to the family Loganiaceae.

It grows as a creeper in dense forests in its natural habitat. It has uses as a medicinal plant, especially the roots and leaves.

References

Loganiaceae
Plants described in 1901
Flora of China
Flora of Japan
Flora of Taiwan
Medicinal plants